Qatruyeh (also Romanized as Qaţrūyeh; also known as  Ghotrooyeh, Qaţrū’īyeh, Katru, and Qatru) is a city and capital of Qatruyeh District, in Neyriz County, Fars Province, Iran.  At the 2006 census, its population was 2,746, in 768 families.

References

Populated places in Neyriz County

Cities in Fars Province